U.S. Route 19 Truck (US 19 Truck) is a truck route of U.S. Route 19 (US 19) located in Western Pennsylvania in the Pittsburgh Metro Area that has a length of .  It is a loop off US 19; the southern terminus located in Mt. Lebanon and the northern terminus in McCandless Township, connecting to US 19 at both ends.  The route is notable for a large, unorthodox interchange with the Penn–Lincoln Parkway (I-376/US 22/US 30) just west of the Fort Pitt Tunnel, where the route joins the Parkway and forms several wrong-way concurrencies, including one with its own opposing directions.  North of Pittsburgh, U.S. Route 19 Truck is called McKnight Road and south of Pittsburgh it carries West Liberty Avenue and Washington Road.

Route description

Southern terminus to five-route concurrency

US 19 Truck begins as U.S. Route 19 enters Mount Lebanon along Washington Road.  US 19 branches northwest to skirt Mt. Lebanon and Dormont, following Cochran Road, while US 19 Truck stays on Washington Road and continues through the centers of those towns.  As US 19 Truck enters the southern parts of Pittsburgh, its name becomes West Liberty Avenue as it passes through the Beechview neighborhood.  At the south portal of the Liberty Tunnel, US 19 Truck interchanges with Pennsylvania Route 51 (Saw Mill Run Boulevard) and joins it, following it north.

After , US 19 Truck and PA 51 encounter the Penn–Lincoln Parkway, carrying I-376/US 22/US 30, at a complex, unorthodox interchange complex that stretches roughly half a mile along the Parkway and rests just south of the Fort Pitt Tunnel.  Mainline US 19 also resides within this interchange, exiting the Parkway and traveling north to join PA 51.  Here, US 19 Truck joins the Parkway.

Northbound US 19 Truck exits PA 51 at a left exit, turning toward the westbound Parkway, which also contains a right-in/right-out ramp for Woodville Avenue.  The ramp merges into the southbound US 19 mainline ramp, forming a wrong-way concurrency, but remains separated from the Penn–Lincoln Parkway via Jersey barrier.  The ramp travels for roughly half a mile in this fashion before making a U-shaped curve.  Before this ramp passes under the Parkway, it merges with southbound US 19 Truck (which exits the Penn–Lincoln Parkway from the Fort Pitt Tunnel), forming a wrong-way concurrency with itself.  Mainline US 19 separates after the underpass and travels southbound as Banksville Road, and the ramp (carrying north and south US 19 Truck) curves northward, joining with the northbound US 19 mainline.  The ramp now merges into the Penn–Lincoln Parkway, forming four lanes of I-376/US 22/US 30/both directions of US 19 Truck/US 19.  After a short stretch, southbound US 19 Truck exits south at the next ramp, removing one lane from the Parkway, and after passing under PA 51, northbound mainline US 19 exits as well, also removing a lane.  The Penn–Lincoln Parkway, now with both directions carrying I-376/US 22/US 30/US 19 Truck and in an orthodox orientation, enter the Fort Pitt Tunnel.

Fort Pitt Tunnel to Interstate 279 Interchange
After exiting the Fort Pitt Tunnel, US 19 Truck/I-376/US 22/US 30 cross the Monongahela River on the Fort Pitt Bridge, arriving on the Golden Triangle of downtown Pittsburgh.  The route meets the southern terminus of Interstate 279 here, and I-376/US 22/US 30 head eastward, while US 19 Truck separates from them and joins I-279 on its northward trek.  The two routes then cross the Allegheny River on the Fort Duquesne Bridge.  North of the bridge, I-279 and US 19 Truck interchange with the southern terminus of Pennsylvania Route 65 at exit 1C of I-279.  Exit 1B is to PNC Park and exit 1C is for Heinz Field.  At exit 1D and 2A, I-279 southbound splits into HOV lanes at the Interstate 279 Interchange. The Interstate 279 interchange involves the northern terminus of Interstate 579 and the southern terminus of Pennsylvania Route 28.

Exit 2 to northern terminus
North of Exit 2B, I-279 has HOV lanes and continues its concurrency with US 19 Truck towards the north. At exit 4, US 19 Truck splits from I-279 and US 19 Truck continues towards the north at-grade as McKnight Road, a frequently congested divided highway known locally as McNightmare Road. In Ross Township, US 19 Truck interchanges with Babcock Boulevard and shifts towards the northwest. The remainder of the route widens to six lanes, and heavily lined with shopping centers and large malls, including North Hills Village, Ross Park Mall, and McCandless Crossing. In McCandless Township, US 19 Truck interchanges with Ingomar Road. Northwest of Ingomar Road, US 19 Truck turns west, paralleling and crossing Pine Creek before it terminates (ends) at a partial Y-interchange with U.S. Route 19.

History
The roadway was signed as US 19 from 1941 to 1948.  The route was signed in 1946 as a bypass route for trucks that were not allowed on US 19.  In 1948, the southern terminus was moved from Banksville Road to its current location.  In 1989, US 19 Truck's designation was moved to I-279 to form a complete US 19 Truck from Mount Lebanon to Wexford after the Parkway North was completed.  In 1997, construction began on the interchange at the southern portal of the Liberty Tunnel, and opened to traffic on November 20, 1999.

Major intersections

See also

References

External links

Multiplexed Roads - U.S. Route 19 Truck junction list

Truck (Pittsburgh)
19 Truck (Pittsburgh)
19 Truck (Pittsburgh)
Transportation in Allegheny County, Pennsylvania
Transportation in Pittsburgh
Mt. Lebanon, Pennsylvania